The Final Frontier World Tour was a concert tour by Iron Maiden in support of the band's 15th album, The Final Frontier, which began on 9 June 2010 in Dallas and ended in London, England on 6 August 2011. The tour was announced on the band's official website on 5 March 2010 under the following statement:
"Iron Maiden are pleased to announce that their forthcoming new studio album will be called 'The Final Frontier', and is expected be released late summer of this year.
The announcement comes with news of a North American Tour with Very Special Guests Dream Theater to open in Dallas, Texas, on 9th June and finish in Washington, D.C. on 20th July, making it Maiden's most extensive North American tour in many years.
Following these shows in USA and Canada The Final Frontier World Tour will travel back to Europe for a few selected major festival and stadium shows with the band planning to continue to many other countries in 2011."
The tour was extremely successful, with the band performing 98 shows in 36 countries across 5 continents to an estimated audience of well over 2 million people and led to 2012's live album/ video, En Vivo!.

Background
The first leg of the tour was announced alongside the album title on 4 March, to include North American and European dates. The full track listing and artwork was unveiled on 8 June, along with a free download of the song El Dorado, confirmed as the only song from The Final Frontier to be played on the 2010 tour. In their list of the Top 50 North American Tours of 2012, Pollstar reported that, from 23 shows, the band grossed US$14.6 million from 274,289 ticket sales.
 
On 5 August 2010, Iron Maiden began releasing dates for the 2011 tour with a series of shows in Australia, incorporating several Soundwave festival appearances and two arena shows. This was followed by the announcement of a string of Scandinavian dates on 21 September, including shows in Oslo, Gothenburg, Helsinki, and the Roskilde Festival in Denmark.
On 2 November, the band announced a total of 29 additional performances over 66 days, starting in Moscow on 11 February 2011, and continuing through Singapore, Indonesia, South Korea, Japan, Mexico, South America, Florida and encompassing the previously announced Australian dates. The band also confirmed that they would again be using the converted Boeing 757, dubbed "Ed Force One", as on the Somewhere Back in Time World Tour and that the setlist would be modified to include more material from the new album as well as older songs. It was during this leg of the tour that the band's 2012 live album and video, En Vivo!, was recorded, with concert footage shot in Buenos Aires and Santiago.

A ten date United Kingdom leg was announced on 11 November for July and August 2011, with an additional show in London confirmed to be the last of the tour. On 18 November, the band continued releasing European dates with eight additional shows in Continental Europe, encompassing Germany, The Netherlands and France (with an extra French date announced on 30 November). This was followed by the announcement of headline performances at Rock Werchter in Belgium on 30 November and Nova Rock Festival in Austria on 10 December.

The 2011 tour would also see Iron Maiden undertaking several headline performances at the Sonisphere Festivals, confirming Warsaw (on 14 December), Madrid (on 17 December), Basel (on 20 December), Imola (on 2 February), Czech Republic (on 8 February), Athens (on 24 February), Sofia (on 10 March) and Istanbul (on 2 April).

Overall, three dates were cancelled while one was postponed. Due to the 2011 Tōhoku earthquake and tsunami on 11 March, both Japanese shows were cancelled. The concert in Rio de Janeiro was postponed till the following night after the front crowd control barrier collapsed during the opening song. On 14 June, it was announced that Sonisphere Bulgaria, due to take place in Sofia, was officially cancelled. A statement published on the Iron Maiden official website claimed that this was due to "logistical problems".

In their list of the Top 25 Worldwide Tours of 2011, Pollstar reported that, from 46 concerts, Iron Maiden sold 718,313 tickets and grossed $53.5 million. The tour's overall attendance was estimated at over 2 million with 98 shows in 36 countries encompassing 5 continents.

Live release
Band manager Rod Smallwood commented in a press release for the compilation album From Fear to Eternity that the shows in Argentina and Chile would be recorded for a live DVD, slated for release in late 2011. On 17 January, a 2-disc DVD, CD and Blu-ray entitled En Vivo!, filmed at the band's Santiago show at Estadio Nacional, was confirmed for a worldwide release on 26 March. The DVD and Blu-ray also featured an 88-minute documentary, Behind the Beast, and the music video for "Satellite 15...The Final Frontier" and its "Making Of" video.

Reception
The tour received positive reviews in print media, heralded as "out of this world" by the News of the World, while The Independent deemed it "a blinding show, a brilliant fusion of high camp and proper heaviness." Metal Hammer awarded the band full marks, stating that it was "exactly the energetic show that has made Maiden the most loved metal band ever." Classic Rock were also positive, commenting that the band are "perennially preposterous but undeniably exciting, they appeal to the geeky fanboy inside all of us – regardless of age, sex or nationality."

The band members' respective prowess was the subject of much praise, with Metal Hammer saying that "everyone was in top form" and the Edmonton Journal commenting that "It's hard to believe that Maiden could have been any more energetic when they were at their peak in the early '80s; truly the metal gods have gifted these six with powers beyond that of mere mortals." Bruce Dickinson in particular was referred to regularly as "the envy of a man half his age".

Many publications noted the wide range of ages present during the tour, complimenting the band's ability to maintain a young audience.

The omission of commonly played songs such as "Run to the Hills" and "The Trooper" from the 2010 setlist led to some criticism, with the Calgary Herald suggesting that "...striking a more even balance between that new material and the unsinkable, ironclad battleships of yesteryear, would have made an incredibly satisfying show that much greater". Speaking in defence of the band's choice of setlist, Mike Portnoy (then of Dream Theater) said: "I can understand that fans want to hear the hits, but I can understand that Maiden don't want to be stuck playing the same songs for the rest of their lives. They put out new music so they want to play the new music." Interviewed for the Pittsburgh Post-Gazette on 14 July, Janick Gers responded to criticism of the setlist:
"It's really important if you're going to remain a valid band that you play your new stuff. Otherwise you become a parody of what you started out doing. But it's impossible [to play more from the new album]. Back in the early 80s you could probably do it, but now with YouTube and downloading, the songs would all be out before the album was out. We did Somewhere Back in Time and that dealt with the 80s, and the time before that we did A Matter of Life and Death, just the one album. You can't go out and play the greatest hits every time – it's important to play the newer songs because we really believe in them."

Even though the 2011 tour saw the band playing more of their 1980s tracks, the setlist still received criticism from reviewers, with The Guardian arguing that "lumbering new prog monsters, such as 'When the Wild Wind Blows', pale beside early headbangers 'Running Free' and 'Iron Maiden'." Kerrang! also criticised the set for being "slightly too focussed on their lengthy new material", claiming that this resulted in "alienating some people", although going on to state that they admire the band for "refusing to become the nostalgia act" and that it is "important that they still take these risks." Metal Hammer, on the other hand, praised the band for "not pandering to expectations, sticking to [their] guns and doing what [they] think is right – regardless of peer pressure", claiming that this is "the very spirit of heavy metal."

Reflecting on the tour in his 2017 memoir What Does This Button Do?, Dickinson recalled a 'robust' meeting with manager Rod Smallwood following the conclusion of the 2011 UK dates, airing concerns that the band were feeling particularly exhausted after a 35 date fourth leg. Although stating that he had no intention of retiring, he suggested that the band's members may not be able to maintain such an intense schedule in their advancing years, and that 'little and often' was a better strategy for future tours. The band have noticeably increased rest periods between tours and individual shows since this time.

Set

Regarding the stage production, Steve Harris remarked on 7 June 2010:
"We’re hugely excited about this tour. I think the fans will really like the brand new stage production and lights... Eddie has changed a bit for this tour but is possibly the most outrageous one to date... I can’t say too much about him as don’t want to spoil the surprise but I guarantee he will scare the hell out of you!"
Throughout the tour, the stage was decorated in a futuristic manner befitting The Final Frontier. Two large antennae adorned the back corners, both topped by lights. The long-used wraparound set, surrounding the band and providing a runway for Bruce Dickinson complete with two podiums, was decorated to look like a space ship with the monitors painted to match and featuring the new "Cross-keys" symbol. "S-15" appeared multiple times on the set, a reference to "Satellite 15... The Final Frontier", along with a succession of dots and lines at the back, spelling out "Eddie Lives" in morse code. The entrances to the stage were covered by two curtains painted as doors, and the stage floor was decorated to look like the rocky surface of a planet (changed to a metallic pattern in 2011). As with previous tours, Nicko McBrain's drumkit featured a Sooty puppet, this time dressed in a spacesuit.

The walk-on Eddie, a regular fixture of the band's tours, appeared in his new incarnation as an extraterrestrial. Complete with an "Ed-cam" (a point of view camera which fed directly to the projector screens), the new Eddie was smaller than those of previous tours, and was the first to appear with a guitar on stage. Eddie broke his guitar in Valencia, the last date of the 2010 tour, during the song "Iron Maiden", although it was replaced in 2011. In São Paulo, Rio de Janeiro, Buenos Aires, Santiago and throughout the second European leg a giant Eddie was used during "Iron Maiden", appearing at the back of the set with flashing eyes and hands gripping either side of the rear walkway (the walk-on Eddie, from that point, being used during "The Evil That Men Do").

The 2011 leg of the tour also saw Bruce Dickinson using a mic stand on stage for the first time since The Ed Hunter Tour of 1999.

Opening acts

2010
Dream Theater on all North American dates except Winnipeg.
Automan in Winnipeg. 
Heaven & Hell were scheduled to support in both Bergen, Norway and Dublin, Ireland, but due to Ronnie James Dio's ongoing battle with cancer, all of the band's summer concerts were cancelled on 4 May. Dio later died on 16 May 2010.
Dark Tranquillity were announced as the Bergen replacement.
Sweet Savage were announced as the Dublin replacement. 
Cargo in Cluj-Napoca, Romania.
Labyrinth in Codroipo, Italy.
Edguy in Valencia.

2011
Rise to Remain in Russia, Singapore, Indonesia, South Korea, the Australian stadia, Germany, The Netherlands, France and were due to support in Japan.
Bullet for My Valentine were due to support in Japan.
Maligno in Mexico.
Potestad in Bogotá.
Contracorriente in Lima.
Cavalera Conspiracy in São Paulo.
Shadowside in Rio de Janeiro- performed show on 27 March, but not the rescheduled show on 28 March.
Khallice in Brasília.
Stress in Belém.
Terra Prima in Recife.
Motorocker in Curitiba.
Kamelot in Buenos Aires.
Barilari in Buenos Aires.
Exodus in Santiago.
Slipknot In Greece, Turkey, Germany, Switzerland, and Italy.
Black Tide in Florida.
Sabaton in Gothenburg.
Graveyard in Gothenburg.
Alice Cooper in Finland and Norway.
LowRiderZ in Saint Petersburg.
Mindlock in Faro.
Airbourne in the United Kingdom, excluding Belfast and London.
DragonForce in Belfast and London (5 August).
Trivium in London (6 August).

Setlist
After the Somewhere Back in Time World Tour, which focused on songs from the band's 1980s albums, the setlist for the 2010 leg of the Final Frontier World Tour consisted primarily of songs recorded since the return of Bruce Dickinson and Adrian Smith in 1999.

The band stated that the 2011 setlist would feature more of their earlier material, as well as additional songs from The Final Frontier. In an interview, Bruce Dickinson said the band would not play the entire album like they did with its predecessor on the first part of the A Matter of Life and Death Tour.

Tour dates

Festivals and other miscellaneous performances
This concert was a part of "Ottawa Bluesfest"
This concert was a part of "Quebec City Summer Festival"
This concert was a part of "Sonisphere Festival"
This concert was a part of "Wacken Open Air"
This concert was a part of "Sziget Festival"
This concert was a part of "Pukkelpop"
This concert was a part of "Soundwave"
This concert was a part of "Nova Rock Festival"
This concert was a part of "Roskilde Festival"
This concert was a part of "Rock Werchter"

Box office score data

Personnel

(Credits taken from the official tour programme.)
Iron Maiden
 Bruce Dickinson – lead vocals
 Dave Murray – guitar
 Adrian Smith – guitar, backing vocals
 Janick Gers – guitar
 Steve Harris – bass guitar, backing vocals
 Nicko McBrain – drums, percussion
Management
Rod Smallwood
Andy Taylor
Booking Agents
Rick Roskin at CAA (North America)
John Jackson at K2 Agency Ltd. (Rest of the World)
Crew
Dickie Bell – Production Consultant
Ian Day – Tour Manager
Steve Gadd – Tour Manager
Patrick Ledwith – Production Manager
Bill Conte – Stage Manager
Zeb Minto – Production Coordinator
Kerry Harris – Production Assistant
Doug Hall – Front of House Sound Engineer
Rob Coleman – Lighting Designer
Steve 'Gonzo' Smith – Monitor Engineer
Antti Saari – Lighting Chief
Sean Brady – Adrian Smith's Guitar Technician
Michael Kenney – Steve Harris' Guitar Technician and keyboards
Charlie Charlesworth – Nicko McBrain's Drum Technician
Justin Garrick – Janick Gers' Guitar Technician
Colin Price – Dave Murray's Guitar Technician
Ian 'Squid' Walsh – Sound Technician
Mike Hackman – Sound System Technician
Paul Stratford – Set Carpenter
Ashley Groom – Set Carpenter
Philip Stewart – Set Carpenter
Griff Dickinson – Set Carpenter
Jeffrey Weir – Head of Security
Natasha De Sampayo – Wardrobe
Andy Matthews – Video Director
Nicholas Birtwistle – Video Technician
Peter Lokrantz – Masseuse/Security
Nick Jones – Merchandising

References

External links
 Official Iron Maiden website
 The Final Frontier World Tour Dates

2010 concert tours
2011 concert tours
Iron Maiden concert tours